Terri Mitchell (born June 13, 1967) is an associate head women's basketball coach at the University of Pittsburgh.  Previously she was the head women's basketball coach at Marquette University. During her tenure, she guided the Golden Eagles to a 348–215 record in 18 seasons. She is the school's all time winningest women's basketball coach, and has taken her teams to postseason play several times. Her teams earned seven straight postseason appearances between 2002 and 2009, including a WNIT championship in 2007. She is the fourth coach in school history.

In her first year, she implemented a transformation, as the team went 21–10, one year after they went 8–20. She has also coached her team to eight 20 win seasons. During the 2006–2007 season, she led the Eagles to a 26–7 record, including Top 25 action for a good portion of the season. The Golden Eagles finished Big East play at 12–4, tied for second place, as Mitchell was named Big East Conference Coach of the year. She played college basketball at Duquesne University.

Mitchell announced her resignation on April 9, 2014. On May 9, 2018, she was announced as an associate head coach for the Pittsburgh Panthers women's basketball team.

Coaching record

References

1967 births
Living people
Marquette Golden Eagles women's basketball coaches
Pittsburgh Panthers women's basketball coaches
American women's basketball coaches